Jana Kubičková-Posnerová (born 9 January 1945) is a Slovak former gymnast. She won silver medals in the team competition at the 1964 and 1968 Summer Olympics. Individually, her best achievement was eighth place in the floor exercise in 1968.

She married Václav Kubička, an Olympic gymnast who also competed at the 1964 and 1968 Olympics.

References

1945 births
Living people
Slovak female artistic gymnasts
Olympic gymnasts of Czechoslovakia
Gymnasts at the 1964 Summer Olympics
Gymnasts at the 1968 Summer Olympics
Olympic silver medalists for Czechoslovakia
Olympic medalists in gymnastics
Medalists at the 1968 Summer Olympics
Medalists at the 1964 Summer Olympics
Medalists at the World Artistic Gymnastics Championships
People from Nitra District
Sportspeople from the Nitra Region